Swabian or Schwabian, or variation, may refer to:

 the German region of Swabia (German: "Schwaben")
 Swabian German, a dialect spoken in Baden-Württemberg in south-west Germany and adjoining areas (German:"Schwäbisch")
 Danube Swabian people of German origin from the German state of Baden-Württemberg living in Hungary, Croatia, Romania, Serbia
 Swabians, an ethnic group of Germany

See also

 Swabia (disambiguation)
 Swabian Alb, a mountainous region within Swabia
 Duke of Swabia
 Swabian Circle
 Swabian League
 Swabian War
 
 
 
 

Language and nationality disambiguation pages